Diogo João Nogueira Pereira (born 18 December 1995) is a Portuguese footballer who plays for São João de Ver  as a midfielder.

Football career
He made his professional debut for Académica on 20 September 2020 in the Liga Portugal 2.

References

External links

1995 births
Living people
Sportspeople from Matosinhos
Portuguese footballers
Association football midfielders
Liga Portugal 2 players
AD Oliveirense players
Anadia F.C. players
Associação Académica de Coimbra – O.A.F. players
SC São João de Ver players